Emil Karas (December 13, 1933 – November 25, 1974) was an American professional football player who was a linebacker in the National Football League (NFL) for the Washington Redskins and in the American Football League  (AFL) with the Los Angeles / San Diego Chargers.  He was on the Chargers' 1963 AFL Championship team, and an AFL All-Star in 1961, 1962, and 1963.  Karas played college football at the University of Dayton and was drafted in the third round of the 1959 NFL Draft. He died of pancreatic cancer on November 25, 1974, a month before his 41st birthday.

References

 

1933 births
1974 deaths
American Football League All-Star players
American Football League announcers
American football linebackers
Dayton Flyers football players
Los Angeles Chargers players
San Diego Chargers announcers
San Diego Chargers players
Washington Redskins players
People from Swissvale, Pennsylvania
Players of American football from Pittsburgh
Deaths from pancreatic cancer
Deaths from cancer in California
American Football League players